The 1962 Northern Ireland general election was held on 31 May 1962. While the Ulster Unionist Party lost three seats, they retained a large majority as in all previous elections to the Parliament of Northern Ireland.

Results

|}
All parties shown.Electorate: 903,596 (458,838 in contested seats); Turnout: 66.0% (302,681).

Votes summary

Seats summary

See also
List of members of the 10th House of Commons of Northern Ireland

References
Northern Ireland Parliamentary Election Results 

1962
Northern Ireland general election
Northern Ireland general election
General election